Kurmangazy may refer to:

Kurmangazy District - a district in Atyrau Province, Kazakhstan
Kurmangazy oil field - an oilfield in Kazakhstan
Kurmangazy Sagyrbayuly - a Kazakh composer